Hamza Abdi Idleh (born on 16 December 1991) is a Djiboutian footballer who plays as a midfielder for FC Dikhil/SGDT and the Djibouti national team.

International career
Hamza debuted on 22 March 2017, in the qualification match of the 2019 Africa Cup of Nations and scored his first goal against South Sudan in a 2–0 victory. On 4 September 2019, he appeared in the 2022 FIFA World Cup qualification and scored his second goal against Eswatini in a 2–1 victory.

Career statistics

International
Scores and results list Djibouti's goal tally first.

References

1991 births
Living people
Djibouti international footballers
Association football midfielders
Djiboutian footballers
AS Ali Sabieh/Djibouti Télécom players
AS Port players
Djibouti Premier League players